Mysterious Castles of Clay is a 1978 film about a termite colony; filmed in Kenya by Joan and Alan Root, and narrated by Orson Welles. It was nominated for an Academy Award for Best Documentary Feature and received a Peabody Award.

Because the original film was lost, only three copies are known to exist in the United States. One of these is in the possession of famed nature documenter Ken Burns, another is in the possession of the science department of the Colorado Rocky Mountain School.

See also
 Orson Welles filmography
 Survival

References

External links

1978 films
American documentary films
Documentary films about nature
1978 documentary films
Films about insects
Peabody Award-winning television programs
Termites
1970s English-language films
1970s American films